Framed is a children's novel by Frank Cottrell Boyce, published in 2005. It was shortlisted for the Carnegie Medal and the Whitbread Children's Book of the Year, and longlisted for the Guardian Children's Fiction Prize. It was also on the shortlist for the Blue Peter Book Awards 2007.

The novel takes its setting from a true-life event, when the Manod (Cwt-y-Bugail) quarry at Blaenau Ffestiniog was used to store art treasures from the National Gallery and the Tate Gallery during World War II.

Summary
Framed, set in North Wales, is the story of how paintings moved from the National Gallery in London affect the town of Manod.

Dylan is the only boy living in the tiny Welsh town of Manod. His parents run the Snowdonia Oasis Auto Marvel garage—and when he's not trying to persuade his sisters to play football, Dylan is in charge of the petrol log. And, that means he gets to keep track of everyone coming in and out of Manod- what car they drive, what they're called, weather and even their favorite flavor of crisps. His Auto garage is going into bankruptcy though, meaning Dylan might have to leave his lifelong home. But, when a mysterious convoy of lorries trundles up the misty mountainside towards an old, disused mine, even Dylan is confounded. Who are these people and what have they got to hide? This is a story inspired by a press cutting describing how, during World War II, the treasured contents of London's National Gallery were stored in Welsh slate mines. Once a month, a morale-boosting masterpiece would be unveiled in the village and then returned to London for viewing. This is a funny and touching exploration of how art — its beauty and its value — touches the life of one little boy and his big family in a very small town.

Television film adaptation
Framed was produced as an adult television film by the BBC, starring Trevor Eve and Eve Myles, and adapted by the author.  It was first shown on 31 August 2009.

Footnotes

External links

2005 British novels
British children's novels
British novels adapted into films
Novels by Frank Cottrell-Boyce
Novels set in Gwynedd
2005 children's books
HarperCollins books